Kiss Kiss may refer to:

Books
 Kiss Kiss (book), a collection of short stories by Roald Dahl

Music
 Kiss Kiss (band), an American indie rock band
 "Kiss Kiss" (Chris Brown song)
 "Kiss Kiss" (Kim Hyun-joong song) 
 "Kiss Kiss" (Ladies' Code song)
 "Kiss Kiss" (Madeline Merlo song)
 "Kiss Kiss", a song by Machine Gun Kelly from Tickets to My Downfall
 "Kiss Kiss", a song by Prince Royce from Soy el Mismo
 "Kiss, Kiss", a song by Yeah Yeah Yeahs from Is Is
 "Şımarık", or "Kiss Kiss", a Turkish-language song by Tarkan covered by Stella Soleil and Holly Valance

See also
 Kiss (disambiguation)
 Kiss Kiss Bang Bang (disambiguation)
 Kiss Kiss Kiss (disambiguation)
 Kiss x Kiss, a manga series by Chitose Yagami
 Kiss-Kiss, a brand of candy produced by Fazer